The Nuclear Industry Association (NIA) is a subscription based trade association for the civil nuclear industry in the United Kingdom. It represents more than 260 companies across the nuclear supply chain. The diversity of  NIA membership enables effective and constructive industry-wide interaction. It publishes the quarterly magazine, Industry Link and it represents over 65,000 workers.

The NIA believes nuclear energy is essential to meet the UK's clean energy needs. As part of a diversified energy mix, nuclear-generated energy provides safe and reliable electricity for UK homes, hospitals, schools and industries.

Its objectives are to:
 Improve the commercial performance of the nuclear industry by supporting member companies develop their businesses in the UK and overseas.
 Engage with the public, media and politicians to promote better understanding of nuclear energy and its role within a low carbon energy mix.
 Work collaboratively across the nuclear industry to promote Science, Technology, Engineering and Maths (STEM) to young people.

Members 
The NIA includes members from across the UK, including the operators of nuclear power stations, those engaged in nuclear power station decommissioning, waste management, nuclear liabilities management and all aspects of the nuclear fuel cycle, nuclear equipment suppliers, engineering and construction firms, nuclear research organization, and legal, financial and consultancy companies.

Member subscriptions pay for all NIA activity.

Leadership
Tom Greatrex is the NIA's chief executive. Appointed in February 2016, he succeeded Keith Parker who had been chief executive for more than a decade. A board of directors made up of senior people from across the civil nuclear supply chain and research bodies oversee the direction of the organization. Lord Hutton of Furness acted as chairman from 2011 until 2018, and was succeeded by Dr Tim Stone.

Services 
The NIA offers a range of services to its members to help improve the commercial performance of the nuclear industry by supporting member companies to develop their business in the UK and overseas.

It organizes business group meetings to help share information and provide networking opportunities for its members. These groups cover:
 New build
 Decommissioning and existing generation
 Legal and financial affairs
 Exports
 Quality
 External relations
 Nuclear supply chain partnership
NIA members can also access a comprehensive Trade Directory to find products and services from UK-based companies across the nuclear sector.

Conferences 
The NIA holds conferences for its members. Its annual conference, Nuclear 2016, took place on 1 December 2016. The conference was previously known as "Energy Choices and #Nuclear – Powering the UK". The conference attracts speakers covering aspects of the nuclear sector and Government. Energy Minister, Andrea Leadsom, spoke at the 2015 event.

The NIA also holds a biennial Nuclear New Build conference. The two day event took place in the summer of 2017. This event looked at the progress being made across all new build projects, the opportunities and challenges they face, and opportunities for supply chain companies.

re:generation 
To engage the public on civil nuclear issues and how nuclear compares to other low carbon sources of electricity generation, the NIA runs a campaign called re:generation. The campaign is aimed at school age children and involves classroom based events and talks.

Subjects covered include the pros and cons of different sources of energy, how nuclear power works, the types of jobs available in the nuclear sector through the apprenticeship and graduate route, and practical sessions on natural radiation and half life.

Schools are able to get in touch directly with the NIA to arrange a visit and talk.

Key publications 
To help further the interests of the nuclear supply chain and inform people about the nuclear sector, the NIA produces several publications.

Nuclear Energy Facts provides bite-sized and clear information about the nuclear sector in a format accessible to all ages.

The Capability Report outlines the capability of the UK supply chain to deliver nuclear new build. Originally published in 2008, it helped inform the government's nuclear strategy. It was last updated in 2012.

The Essential Guide provides lower tier contractors with an introduction to the processes, procedures, and working arrangements required to design, construct, and commission new nuclear power plants in the UK.

Industry Link is the NIA's membership magazine that covers the latest news and developments within NIA member companies, government, and the industry as a whole.

See also
 Department for Business, Energy and Industrial Strategy
 FORATOM
 Nuclear Decommissioning Authority
 United Kingdom Atomic Energy Authority
 World Association of Nuclear Operators
 World Energy Council
 World Nuclear Association

References

External links
 Nuclear Industry Association
 

1963 establishments in the United Kingdom
Trade associations based in the United Kingdom
Organisations based in the City of Westminster
Organizations established in 1963
Nuclear energy in the United Kingdom
Nuclear industry organizations